Spořice is a municipality and village in Chomutov District in the Ústí nad Labem Region of the Czech Republic. It has about 1,500 inhabitants.

References

Villages in Chomutov District